Drenovac is a village in the municipality of Paraćin, Serbia. According to the 2002 census, the village has a population of 2009 people.

Nearby is the celebrated archaeological site of Drenovac.

References

Populated places in Pomoravlje District